Calliobasis spectrum is a species of extremely small deep water sea snail, a marine gastropod mollusk in the family Seguenziidae.

Description
The height of the shell attains 2.5 mm.

Distribution
This marine species occurs off the Philippines and New Caledonia.

References

External links
 To Encyclopedia of Life
 To World Register of Marine Species
 

spectrum
Gastropods described in 1991